Nothin' But Drama is the second album by American R&B group Profyle, released on October 17, 2000, by Motown Records. The album peaked at number 50 on the Billboard 200 and spawned three singles: "Liar", "Damn" and "Nasty".

Track listing

Personnel
 Kedar Massenburg - executive producer
 Shante Paige - associate executive producer
 Tom Coyne, Chris Gehringer - mastering
 Jonathan Mannion - photography
 Robert Sims - art direction

Charts

References

2000 albums
Profyle albums
Motown albums
Albums produced by Teddy Riley